Roger Rene Joseph Savoie (July 29, 1931 – August 17, 2009) was a defensive lineman who played fifteen seasons in the Canadian Football League for the Winnipeg Blue Bombers. In 2005 he was inducted into the Manitoba Sports Hall of Fame and Museum.

External links 
Roger Savoie’s biography at Manitoba Sports Hall of Fame and Museum
Winnipeg Free Press Obituary

1931 births
2009 deaths
People from Saint Boniface, Winnipeg
Canadian football defensive linemen
Franco-Manitoban people
Players of Canadian football from Manitoba
Canadian football people from Winnipeg
Winnipeg Blue Bombers players